José Raúl Iglesias (nicknamed Toti), (Buenos Aires, born 6 March 1957) is a retired footballer of Argentina. His position on the field was centre forward, having scored 117 goals in Primera División during his career. He won two championships in lower divisions of Argentina, being the topscorer of the tournament in both cases.

Iglesias is also the top-scorer of the 1980s in Argentine football, having scored 105 goals in 144 matches.

Biography

Born in Boedo, city of Buenos Aires, Iglesias grew up imitating his idol, Luis Artime, a notable forward of the 1960s. He spent his youth career at San Lorenzo de Almagro, debuting in Primera División at 18, in 1976 in a match v. Unión de Santa Fe. Iglesias scored his first goal in Primera that same day, by penalty shoot-out. Alberto Rendo was the coach of San Lorenzo by then.

Iglesias would be later transferred to Sarmiento de Junín, where he became top scorer of the team that won the 1980 Primera B championship.

Iglesias had a long career as scorer, becoming an idol for the Sarmiento de Junín and Racing Club de Avellaneda supporters.

Iglesias was the Primera B Nacional top scorer at the 1986-87 season playing for Huracán (which also promoted to Primera División) where he scored 36 goals in 37 matches, setting a record for the division. After his tenure on El Globito, Iglesias was traded to Racing Club, where he became an idol for its supporters who also dedicated him a song. Iglesias formed a praised attacking line along with wingers Ramón Medina Bello and Walter Fernández, with the addition of midfielder Miguel Colombatti and Uruguayan playmaker Rubén Paz. His most remembered match playing for Racing was a smashing victory over Boca Juniors by 6–0, with two goals by Iglesias.

Like Mexican striker Hugo Sánchez, Iglesias' trademark was to perform a celebratory somersault after each goal he scored.

In Primera División Iglesias scored 117 goals in 288 matches. Iglesias is the top-scorer of the 1980s in Argentine football, having scored 105 goals in 144 matches. Nevertheless, he was never called up for the Argentina national team.

Honours
Sarmiento (J)
Primera B (1): 1980
Huracán
Primera B Nacional (1): 1986-87

References

External links

Héroes de Ayer profile 

1957 births
Living people
Footballers from Buenos Aires
Argentine footballers
Association football forwards
Argentine Primera División players
Primera Nacional players
San Lorenzo de Almagro footballers
All Boys footballers
Club Atlético Sarmiento footballers
Rosario Central footballers
Estudiantes de La Plata footballers
Club Atlético Huracán footballers
Racing Club de Avellaneda footballers
Talleres de Córdoba footballers
Deportivo Español footballers
Club Atlético Lanús footballers
La Liga players
Segunda División players
Segunda División B players
FC Barcelona Atlètic players
Recreativo de Huelva players
CD Logroñés footballers
Valencia CF players
Categoría Primera A players
Atlético Junior footballers
Argentine football managers
Segunda División managers
CD Badajoz managers
Argentine expatriate footballers
Argentine expatriate football managers
Argentine expatriate sportspeople in Spain
Argentine expatriate sportspeople in Colombia
Expatriate footballers in Spain
Expatriate footballers in Colombia